The Bangkok Charter for Health Promotion in a Globalized World is the name of an international agreement reached among participants of the 6th Global Conference on Health Promotion held in Bangkok, Thailand in August 2005, convened by the World Health Organization.  It identifies actions, commitments and pledges required to address the determinants of health in a globalized world through health promotion.

About the Declaration
The Bangkok Charter recognizes:
 the health inequality between developed and developing nations
 the changing trend of communication and consumption in a globalized world
 urbanization
 global environmental change
 commercialization

Five key areas of action for a healthier world:
 Partner and build alliances with private, non-private, non-governmental or international organizations to create sustainable actions
 Invest in sustainable policies, actions and infrastructure to address the determinants of health
 Build capacity for policy development, health promotion practice and health literacy
 Regulate and legislate to ensure a high level of protection from harm and enable equal opportunity for health and well-being
 Advocate health based on human rights and solidarity

See also
Health promotion
 Ottawa Charter
 Jakarta Declaration
Primary health care
Health for all
Global health
Health policy
Public health

References

External links
The Bangkok Charter for Health Promotion in a Globalized World official website
The Bangkok Charter for Health Promotion in a Globalized World full declaration

Public health